Mahalalel is an Antediluvian patriarch named in the Hebrew Bible. He is mentioned in the Sethite genealogy as the grandfather of Enoch and subsequently the ancestor of Noah.

Etymology 
The meaning of the name could be translated as "the shining one of El." The King James Version spells his name Mahalaleel in the Old Testament and Maleleel in the New Testament.

Biblical narrative 
Mahalalel was born when his father Kenan (Adam's great-grandson through Seth) was 70 years old. He was one of many children of Kenan. (Genesis 5:12-13; 1 Chronicles 1:2; Jubilees 4:14 Luke 3:37). 

When he was aged 54-60, Mahalalel married Dinah, the daughter of his paternal uncle Barakiel. At the age of 65, he fathered Jared (when the Watchers "descended on the earth" as per Jubilees 4:15). He fathered many other children after that point (Genesis 5:15-16).  

At the age of 227, he became a grandfather to Jared's son Enoch (Genesis 5:18), who was born through Baraka, the daughter of Mahalalel's brother Râsûjâl (Jubilees 4:16). 

Sometime before he turned 292, Mahalalel explained to Enoch the first of the two dream visions the latter had, as recounted through the perspective of Enoch:

When Mahalalel was 840, his 962-year-old father Kenan died (Genesis 5:14). Mahalalel lived 55 more years after this and died at 895 (Genesis 5:17), placing him eighth in the records for the unusually long lifespans for the antediluvian patriarchs.  

At the time of Mahalalel's death, Noah was 234 as per the Masoretic chronology.

Genealogy

In Islam 
Mahalalel is mentioned in the various collections of tales of the pre-Islamic prophets, which mentions him in an identical manner. Islamic scholar Tabari tells that his story was also found in Persian literature and likens him with the Pishdadian king Hushang.

Allusions

Latter Day Saint usage
In the original 1835 edition of the Doctrine and Covenants, Mahalaleel was used as a code name for Algernon Sidney Gilbert.

Literature 
Thomas Hardy, in his novel, The Return of the Native (1878), referenced Mahalaleel as one who betokened an advanced lifetime: "The number of their years may have adequately summed up Jared, Mahalaleel, and the rest of the antediluvians, but the age of a modern man is to be measured by the intensity of his history."  

The pet cat that comes to the manor in the storm in Joyce Carol Oates's novel Bellefleur (1980) is named Mahalaleel.

Films 
Mahalalel is named as part of the Generations of Adam by the narrator of the film Genesis: The Creation and the Flood (1994). 

In the film Noah (2014), Lamech (played by Marton Csokas) remembers Mahalalel and other ancestors before conferring the Sethite birthright to the young Noah (Dakota Goyo).

References

Book of Genesis people
Bereshit (parashah)